Joseph Murray (28 August 1908 – 1988) was an English footballer who played in the Football League for Hull City and Lincoln City.

References

1908 births
1988 deaths
English footballers
Association football forwards
English Football League players
Hull City A.F.C. players
Lincoln City F.C. players